Richard Arden may refer to:
 Richard Arden, 3rd Baron Alvanley (1792–1857), British Army officer and peer
 Richard Pepper Arden, 1st Baron Alvanley (1744–1804), British barrister and politician

See also
 Richard Arden-Davis (1855–1917), English cricketer and Anglican clergyman